Tomahawk Lake is a lake in Oneida County, Wisconsin, United States. The community of Lake Tomahawk is located on the eastern edge of the lake. Tomahawk Lake was so named from the fact its outline resembles a tomahawk.

Tomahawk Lake is the source of the Tomahawk River.  Historically Tomahawk Lake was part of travel route for traders and Indians who portaged to and from the Wisconsin River at the east end of the lake.

References

Lakes of Oneida County, Wisconsin